Group A of the 2007 Fed Cup Europe/Africa Zone Group I was one of four pools in the Europe/Africa Zone Group I of the 2007 Fed Cup. Four teams competed in a round robin competition, with the top team and the bottom team proceeding to their respective sections of the play-offs: the top team played for advancement to the World Group II Play-offs, while the bottom team faced potential relegation to Group II.

Switzerland vs. Denmark

Netherlands vs. Romania

Switzerland vs. Romania

Netherlands vs. Denmark

Switzerland vs. Netherlands

Denmark vs. Romania

See also
Fed Cup structure

References

External links
 Fed Cup website

2007 Fed Cup Europe/Africa Zone